Ladya Cheryl Baharrizki or better known as Ladya Cheryl (born in Jakarta, Indonesia on April 11, 1981) is an Indonesian actress, model, and filmmaker. She won the Citra Award for Best Actress in 2022 for her performance as Iteung in Vengeance Is Mine, All Others Pay Cash.

Career 
Cheryl began her career as a model in the late 1990s. She appeared in a number of music videos before making her feature film debut playing the role of Alya in the 2002 hit drama Ada Apa dengan Cinta?, for which she received a Citra Award nomination for Best Supporting Actress. In 2008, she played the lead role of Alisha in Mouly Surya's award-winning directorial debut Fiksi. opposite Donny Alamsyah and Kinaryosih. For her performance, she garnered a Citra Award nomination for Best Actress, but lost to Fahrani.

Cheryl is a frequent collaborator of the Citra Award-winning director Edwin; having appeared in three of his short films and three of his feature films, including the universally acclaimed Vengeance Is Mine, All Others Pay Cash, an adaptation of Eka Kurniawan's novel of the same name. Cheryl received multiple Best Actress nominations for her performance as Iteung, winning her first Citra Award for Best Actress.

Personal life 
Cheryl is married to musician Zeke Khaseli, the son of former cabinet minister and retired special force general Agum Gumelar and former Minister for Women's Empowerment Linda Amalia Sari. Their got married on 9 May 2014. Khaseli, whose real name is Haris Khaseli Gumelar, also works in the film industry as a composer for films, including Mouly Surya's Fiksi. in which Cheryl starred in the lead role.

She is also related to badminton champion and Olympic gold medalist Taufik Hidayat who is married to Ami Gumelar, her husband's sister.

In the 2008 film Blind Pig Who Wants to Fly, Cheryl portrayed the character of Linda while a younger version of her was portrayed by Clairine Baharrizki, who is her relative. The two also appeared together in Edwin's 2005 award-winning short film Kara, Anak Sebatang Pohon.

Filmography

Production credits

Awards and nominations

References

External links 

1981 births
People from Jakarta
Indonesian actresses
Indonesian female models
Living people